Daniele  (from 1938 to 1945 Kleinreimannswalde) is a village in the administrative district of Gmina Kowale Oleckie, within Olecko County, Warmian-Masurian Voivodeship in northern Poland. 

References

Daniele